Lake Robertville is an artificial lake located in Wallonia near the city of Malmedy in Belgium. The water volume is 8,000,000 m³ and the area is 0,62 km². The lake is located in the High Fens park. The dam on the river Warche was built in 1928.

Lake Robertville is situated in the municipality of Waimes. It is named after the village of Robertville.

Ourthe basin
Reservoirs in Belgium
Lakes of the Ardennes (Belgium)
Lakes of Liège Province
Lake Robertville
Reservoirs in the Eifel